William Reid Jr. (born 11 January 1986 in Glasgow), is a Scottish retired footballer who played as midfielder for Clyde, and had a short spell with Hamilton Academical.

Career
Reid started his career with Clyde. He made his senior debut in a Scottish First Division match against Ayr United in March 2003. He only made one more appearance after this, before being one of eight U19 players released by the club in January 2004.

He went on to join Hamilton Academical, before returning to Clyde a year later.

Personal life
He is the son of football player and manager Billy Reid.

References

External links

1986 births
Living people
Footballers from Glasgow
Scottish footballers
Association football midfielders
Clyde F.C. players
Hamilton Academical F.C. players
Scottish Football League players